Vladimir Radiyevich Shalin (28 March 1965 – 9 June 2011) was a Russian professional football player and coach.

External links
 

1965 births
Footballers from Moscow
2011 deaths
Soviet footballers
Association football forwards
FC Dynamo Moscow players
Soviet Top League players
FC Fakel Voronezh players
Russian football managers
Burials in Troyekurovskoye Cemetery